CYP39A1 (cytochrome P450, family 39, subfamily A, polypeptide 1) also known as oxysterol 7-α-hydroxylase 2 is a protein that in humans is encoded by the CYP39A1 gene.

This gene encodes a member of the cytochrome P450 superfamily of enzymes. The cytochrome P450 proteins are monooxygenases which catalyze many reactions involved in drug metabolism and synthesis of cholesterol, steroids and other lipids. This endoplasmic reticulum protein is involved in the conversion of cholesterol to bile acids. Its substrates include the oxysterols 24-hydroxycholesterol, 25-hydroxycholesterol and 27-hydroxycholesterol.

References

External links

Further reading